Man-Made Food is a Canadian television cooking show, which airs on Food Network Canada.

The show stars Dave Burnett, Joel Rousell, and Steven Moore.

Food Network (Canadian TV channel) original programming
2000s Canadian cooking television series
2004 Canadian television series debuts